Hampton Pitts Fulmer (June 23, 1875 – October 19, 1944) was an American politician of the Democratic Party.  He represented South Carolina in the United States House of Representatives from 1921 – October 19, 1944.  After his death, his wife Willa L. Fulmer took over his seat.

Fulmer was born near Springfield, South Carolina. He attended the public schools and was graduated from Massey Business College in Columbus, Georgia in 1897. He engaged in agricultural and mercantile pursuits in Norway, South Carolina, and also engaged in banking.

Political career

Fulmer was a member of the South Carolina House of Representatives 1917–1920. He was elected as a Democrat to the Sixty-seventh and to the eleven succeeding Congresses and served from March 4, 1921, until his death. While in Congress, he served as chairman, Committee on Agriculture (Seventy-sixth through Seventy-eighth Congresses). He had been nominated for re-election to the Seventy-ninth Congress before dying in Washington, D.C., October 19, 1944.

During World War II but before Pearl Harbor Fullmer was outspokenly pro-British, and he advocated providing Britain with military aid in their war against Nazi Germany. Fulmer also advocated American entry into the war. In 1941 he voted in favor of the 1941 Lend Lease Act. Fulmer was buried in Memorial Park Cemetery, Orangeburg, South Carolina.

See also
 List of United States Congress members who died in office (1900–49)

References

 

1875 births
1944 deaths
People from Orangeburg County, South Carolina
Democratic Party members of the South Carolina House of Representatives
Democratic Party members of the United States House of Representatives from South Carolina